Filip Peliwo was the champion the previous year, but could not defend his title as he was no longer eligible to compete in junior tennis.
Borna Ćorić won the title, defeating Thanasi Kokkinakis in the final, 3–6, 6–3, 6–1.

Seeds

Main draw

Finals

Top half

Section 1

Section 2

Bottom half

Section 3

Section 4

External links 
 Main draw

Boys' Singles
US Open, 2013 Boys' Singles